John Stewart Leighton (November 8, 1835 – January 25, 1916) was a farmer, merchant and political figure in New Brunswick. He represented Carleton County in the Legislative Assembly of New Brunswick from 1874 to 1886 as a Liberal member.

He was born in Charlotte County, New Brunswick, the son of James Leighton and Ann Stewart. Besides farming, Leighton also became involved in the lumber trade. In 1864, he married Amanda M. Collins; she died in 1875. He lived at Richmond from 1864 to 1873, served on the council for Carleton Council and operated the local post office. Leighton also served as a school trustee. In 1873, he moved to Woodstock, where he owned a store. Leighton also owned a store in Houlton, Maine.

References 
The Canadian biographical dictionary and portrait gallery of eminent and self-made men ... (1881)

1835 births
1916 deaths
New Brunswick Liberal Association MLAs
Canadian Baptists
19th-century Baptists